Labeo coubie, the African carp, is a cyprinid fish, widespread in Africa, where it occurs within the drainage basin of the Nile (Blue, White, Lake Albert) and in the Chad, Niger-Benue, Volta, Senegal and Gambia Rivers, as well as the Cross River and Cameroon coastal rivers. Furthermore, it is also known from East Africa and the middle reaches of the Congo. Records from the Zambezi drainage need confirmation.

References

 

Labeo
Fish described in 1832